Xujiaping is a town in Lueyang County, Hanzhong, Shaanxi, China. , neighborhoods and villages in Xujiaping include: 
 Xujiaping Neighborhood
 Mingshuiba Village
 Mao'ergou Village
 Liujiazhuang Village
 Zhangjiazhuang Village
 Erfangshan Village
 Zhoujiaba Village
 Zhu'erba Village
 Jiekou Village
 Qinggangping Village
 Peijiazhuang Village
 Yaomuyuan Village
 Qinjiaba Village
 Yuchizi Village
 Dashuigou Village

The town was economically struck by the 2008 Sichuan earthquake, as most buildings were destroyed similar to surrounding towns. Xujiaping was visited by then-vice president Xi Jinping.

References 

Township-level divisions of Shaanxi
Lueyang County